Woke Up Dead is an American horror/comedy web series starring Jon Heder (best known for Napoleon Dynamite) as a young man who awakes in a full bathtub after 'drowning' and has no heartbeat, prompting his friends to believe him to be a zombie. The show premiered on Sony Pictures Entertainment owned Crackle on October 5, 2009.

Plot
Drex Greene (Jon Heder) accepts a pill from a stranger and proceeds to wake up in a bathtub after being under water for over fifteen minutes.  His roommate, Matt (Josh Gad), films the happenings from there, which involve morgues, a cute med student named Cassie (Krysten Ritter), detective work, and an unknown stalker.

Cast
Jon Heder as Drex Greene
Krysten Ritter as Cassie
Josh Gad as Matt
Daniel Roebuck as Shadow Man
Wayne Knight as Andrew Batten
Jean Smart as Drex's mother
Ellia English as Diana Phillips
Taryn Southern as Debbie, Drex's ex-girlfriend
Meital Dohan as Aurora
Christopher Emerson as Mystery Pill Guy

Production
Woke Up Dead is a production of Electric Farm Entertainment, a company that produced Afterworld, which currently runs on Crackle, along with Gemini Division and Valemont.  The show is executive produced by Brent V. Friedman, Stan Rogow, and Jeff Sagansky.  Heder's co-stars are Krysten Ritter, Josh Gad, and Wayne Knight. New episodes streamed weekdays through the end of October 2009. The first episode was included on the Zombieland DVD and the entire first season is currently airing in Australia on the Sci Fi Channel. A season one DVD was produced, not as episodes but as a continuous film of approximately 90 minutes.

Episodes

See also
List of zombie short films and undead-related projects

References

External links
 Woke Up Dead
 Woke Up Dead at the Internet Movie Database

2009 web series debuts
2009 web series endings
American comedy web series
Horror fiction web series
Crackle (streaming service) original programming
Zombie web series
Comedy horror web series